The 2006–07 New Zealand Knights FC season was the club's second season in the Australian A-League. The club finishing in eighth place.

Players

Squad

Transfers in

Transfers out

Competitions

Pre-season

A-League

References

New Zealand Knights FC seasons